Christmas in the Smokies is an American Christmas film, set in the Great Smoky Mountains. It follows a small, struggling family-run farm that needs a "miracle" to survive.

It aired originally on INSP in 2015. It has more recently aired on FOX and streaming platforms.

Plot
Shelby Haygood is played by Sarah Lancaster and lives in Tennessee's Smokey Mountains with her parents. They have a simple farm life and its all Shelby has ever known. At 17, her ex-boyfriend Mason, played by Alan Powell, left her to pursue a career as a country singer. Fast forward to the present day, the family's future is threatened when a land grabbing developer has the Haygood farm in his crosshairs.

Christmas in the Smokies follows the journey of how people come together for their neighbours and community. The fight to save the farm ultimately helps Shelby and Mason reconnect, a couple who according to everyone in town were always meant for each other.

Main cast

Reception
The Dove Foundation approved the film for all age groups.

References

2010s Christmas films
films set in Tennessee
INSP Films
American Christmas films
2010s English-language films